O Monstro Precisa de Amigos is the second and final studio album by Portuguese band Ornatos Violeta, released on 22 November 1999 by Polydor.
Two music videos were filmed, for the songs "Ouvi Dizer" and "Capitão Romance".

Recording and production
The recording of Ornatos' second studio album was a difficult one. The band rejected "dozens of songs" during the album's development sessions with producer Mário Barreiros, with the band's members becoming so frustrated that they expressed a sudden desire of giving up on the project completely after just two months of production. Some of these rejected songs, such as "Como Afundar", "Há-de Encarnar", "Rio de Raiva" and "Devagar" were later included in the 2011 release of a CD box containing both studio albums and a third CD, named Inéditos/Raridades, with previously unreleased songs.

Years later, Barreiros said he had identified that frustration as merely the "permanent insatisfaction of the great artists" that allowed them to push their art further away.

Composition
O Monstro Precisa de Amigos is noted to be a much more mature and versatile album than the band's debut Cão!, offering a more meditative and polished sound.

For their second album, the band could count with the guest participation of Gordon Gano of Violent Femmes and Portuguese musician and actor Vítor Espadinha. The Violent Femmes were a long-time reference for Ornatos, and their lead singer Gano shared vocal duties with Manel Cruz in the single "Capitão Romance", in which he sang in Portuguese. Espadinha contributed with the recitation of a poem that can be heard at the end of "Ouvi Dizer", another of the album's singles which has been called a "post-modern classic" by some media outlets.

Reception
The album was considered by the Portuguese music magazine Blitz as the best album of the year in 1999, with Cruz being awarded the best vocalist prize and Ornatos Violeta the best Portuguese ensemble of that year. O Monstro Precisa de Amigos had sold 15 586 copies as of October 2002, which allowed the album to be certified as a silver record in Portugal.

Years later, the album is considered to have turned Ornatos Violeta into one of the most successful rock bands in Portugal. In June 2017, the album was included in Blitz's list of the 30 best Portuguese albums of the last 30 years.

To signal the band's 20 years anniversary, O Monstro Precisa de Amigos was re-released on 5 December 2011 along with Cão! and a CD with previously unreleased work. This CD box release was certified as a platinum record in Portugal.

O Monstro Precisa de Amigos was released for the first time as a vinyl record on 5 February 2012, with Rastilho Records providing a limited and numbered edition of 500 copies of both O Monstro and Cão!.

Track listing

Personnel
The following people are credited on the album:

Performance credits

Manel Cruz – vocals and guitar (tracks 1, 4, 10, 12, 13)
Elísio Donas – piano and keyboards
Kinörm – drums

Peixe – guitar
Nuno Prata – bass

Other credits

Mário Barreiros - production, recording and mixing
Nelson Carvalho - mixing
Manel Cruz – album cover illustration

Jorge Fidalgo - piano technical assistance
Mandy Parnell - mastering

References

1999 albums
Polydor Records albums
Ornatos Violeta albums
Portuguese-language albums